Stoughton is a town in Saskatchewan, Canada. In 2011 it had a population of 649.
Stoughton was originally called New Hope.
The tiny settlement of New Hope was barely three years old when the Canadian Pacific Railway (CPR) arrived in this part of the province in 1904. The CPR chose a location a little to the south for its closest depot, which it called Stoughton. The community of New Hope soon moved to join it.

Stoughton used to have its own small police service, which was aptly named the Stoughton Police Service. It no longer exists and now the Royal Canadian Mounted Police (RCMP) provide policing services to the town and surrounding areas.

Stoughton is approximately eighty-eight miles southeast of Regina at the terminus for highway 33, which is the longest straight road in Canada, and the fifth longest in the world. It is also the administrative headquarters of the Ocean Man First Nations band government. They contain three nations which are Assiniboine, Saulteaux, and Cree.

The town is served by Highway 13, Highway 33, and Highway 47.

Demographics 

Gallery

See also 
 List of communities in Saskatchewan
 List of towns in Saskatchewan
 List of golf courses in Saskatchewan

References

External links

Towns in Saskatchewan
1904 establishments in Saskatchewan
Canadian Pacific Railway
Tecumseh No. 65, Saskatchewan
Division No. 1, Saskatchewan